Beinn Sgulaird or Beinn Sguiliaird is a mountain in the Lorn region of the Scottish Highlands, between Glen Creran and Glen Etive. It has a height of 937 m (3074 ft) and is classed as a Munro. 
The mountain takes the form of a long ridge which runs from southwest to northeast, three kilometres of which lie above 800 m. Hillwalkers commonly traverse the ridge from north to south, as this gives the best views of the Hebrides to the west, in particular the Isle of Mull. While most walkers start from Glen Creran to the west, an ascent from Glen Etive is also possible.

References

Munros
Marilyns of Scotland
Mountains and hills of Argyll and Bute
Mountains and hills of the Southern Highlands